Iniidae is a family of river dolphins containing one living genus, Inia, and four extinct genera. The extant genus inhabits the river basins of South America, but the family formerly had a wider presence across the Atlantic Ocean. 

Iniidae are highly morphologically different from marine dolphins by way of adaptations suited to their freshwater riverine habitat. They also display a high amount of sexual dimorphism in the form of color and size. Seasonal movement between flooded plains and rivers is common, due to the variation of seasonal rain. There has been little research done on the family, in particular the species aside from the Amazon river dolphin.

Evolution
The South American river basins were flooded by marine waters, creating a new brackish habitat that allowed marine mammals to move into them. During the Miocene era, the sea level began to recede, trapping the mammals within the continent.

Morphology 
Their necks are flexible, since their cervical vertebra are movable; this is remarkable since nearly all cetaceans' neck vertebra are fused, which rigidly aims most other cetaceans' heads forward. The Iniidae have other morphology common to species adapted to freshwater riverine habitats; which include highly reduced or absent dorsal fins, so they do not become entangled in vegetation from the flooded terrestrial plains; and large, wide, paddle-like pectoral fins that allow maneuverability in confined areas cramped by vegetation. Other riverine adaptations including a long rostrum, skull and jaw and reduced orbits.

Iniidae share many other characteristics in common with their marine odontocete relatives: Their stomachs include a fore-stomach, singled chambered main stomach, and a pyloric stomach with connecting channels. Like most other cetatians Iniidae have lost their fur and lack true vocal cords. They share the similar structure of the tympanic bulla and lung shape, the position of their diaphragm and the position of the blowhole to the back of the head with their marine ancestors.

The dentition of Iniidae dolphins is heterodont, having conical, small teeth that differ slightly in the front of the mouth. The teeth extend lingually in the back and in the front they have a small depression on the side of each. These mammals are carnivorous, finding prey by using echolocation.

Speciation
There is scientific debate on the number of species within the genus Inia: The main issue is whether there are two or three species, or whether those can be considered sub-species. According to some researchers
 Inia geoffrensis
 Inia humboldtiana
 Inia boliviensis 

are three separate species, while many consider I. geoffrensis and I. boliviensis to be the only two. Martin in 2004 found supporting evidence that genetic exchange occurs between multiple sites on the Amazon, even places hundreds of kilometres apart.

Taxonomy
The family was described by John Edward Gray in 1846.

Current classifications include a single living genus, Inia, with one to four species and several subspecies.
The family also includes three extinct genera described from fossils found in South America, Florida, Libya, and Italy.

Superfamily Inioidea
Family Iniidae
Genus †Goniodelphis
 G. hudsoni
Genus Inia
 Inia araguaiaensis - Araguaian river dolphin
 Inia boliviensis - Bolivian river dolphin
 Inia geoffrensis - Amazon river dolphin
Inia humboldtiana - Orinoco river dolphin
Genus †Isthminia 
†Isthminia panamensis
Genus †Meherrinia
Genus †Ischyrorhynchus (syn. Anisodelphis)
 I. vanbenedeni (syn. Anisodelphis brevirostratus)
Genus †Saurocetes (syn. Saurodelphis, Pontoplanodes)
 S. argentinus (syn. Pontoplanodes obliquus) 
 S. gigas

References

External links

River dolphins
Mammals of South America
Mammals of Brazil
Mammals of Peru
Mammal families
Taxa named by John Edward Gray